Black-box testing is a method of software testing that examines the functionality of an application without peering into its internal structures or workings. This method of test can be applied virtually to every level of software testing: unit, integration, system and acceptance. It is sometimes referred to as specification-based testing.

Test procedures

Specific knowledge of the application's code, internal structure and programming knowledge in general is not required. The tester is aware of what the software is supposed to do but is not aware of how it does it. For instance, the tester is aware that a particular input returns a certain, invariable output but is not aware of how the software produces the output in the first place.

Test cases
Test cases are built around specifications and requirements, i.e., what the application is supposed to do. Test cases are generally derived from external descriptions of the software, including specifications, requirements and design parameters. Although the tests used are primarily functional in nature, non-functional tests may also be used. The test designer selects both valid and invalid inputs and determines the correct output, often with the help of a test oracle or a previous result that is known to be good, without any knowledge of the test object's internal structure.

Test design techniques 

Typical black-box test design techniques include:
 Decision table testing
 All-pairs testing
 Equivalence partitioning
 Boundary value analysis
 Cause–effect graph
 Error guessing
 State transition testing
 Use case testing
 User story testing
 Domain analysis
 Syntax testing
 Combining technique

Hacking
In penetration testing, black-box testing refers to a method where an ethical hacker has no knowledge of the system being attacked. The goal of a black-box penetration test is to simulate an external hacking or cyber warfare attack.

See also

 ABX test
 Acceptance testing
 Blind experiment
 Boundary testing
 Fuzz testing
 Gray box testing
 Metasploit Project
 Sanity testing
 Smoke testing
 Software performance testing
 Software testing
 Stress testing
 Test automation
 Unit testing
 Web application security scanner
 White hat hacker
 White-box testing

References

External links
BCS SIGIST (British Computer Society Specialist Interest Group in Software Testing): Standard for Software Component Testing, Working Draft 3.4, 27. April 2001.

Software testing
Hardware testing